Bahu Beti is a 1965 Hindi film starring Mala Sinha and Joy Mukherjee in the lead roles.

Cast
 Joy Mukherjee as Shekhar
 Mala Sinha as Shanta
 Mumtaz as Savitri
 Mehmood as Mahesh
 Ashok Kumar as Judge
 Achala Sachdev as Mrs. Kaushalya
 Mukri as Kadam
 Dhumal as Nemak Das
 Ratnamala as Shekhar's mother
 Anoop Kumar as Gurudas
 Chaman Puri as Dhanpat Rai

Soundtrack
"Jiyo Toh Aise Jiyo" - Mohammed Rafi
"Rangin Fiza Hai Aaja" - Mahendra Kapoor, Asha Bhosle
"Sab Me Shamil Ho Magar" - Mohammed Rafi
"Bharat Maa Ki Aankh Ke Taro" - Asha Bhosle
"Meri Jaan Na Sata Tu" - Mohammed Rafi
"Meri Mang Ke Rang Me" - Asha Bhosle
"Aaj Hai Karva Chauth" - Asha Bhosle

References

External links
 

1965 films
1960s Hindi-language films
Films scored by Ravi